Nikolskoye is a rural locality (a village) in Pokrovskoye Rural Settlement, Vashkinsky District, Vologda Oblast, Russia. The population was 20 as of 2002.

Geography 
Nikolskoye is located 72 km northwest of Lipin Bor (the district's administrative centre) by road. Dryabloye is the nearest rural locality.

References 

Rural localities in Vashkinsky District